Land of Light is an album by the Scottish traditional folk band The Tannahill Weavers which was released in 1986. The band is joined on several tracks (Bustles and Bonnets, The American Stranger, Conon Bridge, Donald MacLean's Farewell to Oban and The Scottish Settler's Lament) by Scottish fiddler Dougie MacLean. The album was recorded at Castle Sound Studios, the Old School, Midlothian, Scotland.

Track listing
Lucy Cassidy / The Bletherskate / The Smith of Chilliechassie
The Scottish Settler's Lament
Donald MacLean's Farewell to Oban / Dunrobin Castle / The Wise Maid / Iain's Jig
The Rovin' Heilandman
The Yellow-haired Laddie / Dream Angus
Land of Light
The Queen amang the Heather / Mairi Anne MacInnes
Bustles and Bonnets
The American Stranger
Conon Bridge / MacBeth's Strathspey / Maor David Manson / Mrs MacPherson of Inveran

Personnel
Roy Gullane - guitar, mandolin, tenor banjo, vocals
Phil Smillie - flute, whistles, pan pipes, vocals
Ian MacInnes - war pipes, G Scottish small pipes, B-flat Scottish small pipes, whistles, vocals
Ross Kennedy - bouzouki, fiddle, bass pedals, vocals

References 

1986 albums
The Tannahill Weavers albums